Ouparine Djoco (born 22 April 1998) is a French professional footballer who plays as a goalkeeper for Ligue 1 club Clermont.

Career
Djoco is a youth product of Fleury, having joined them at the age of 13. On 19 May 2019, he signed his first professional contract with Clermont. Djoco made his professional debut with Clermont in a 1–1 Ligue 2 tie with Toulouse FC on 19 September 2020.

Personal life
Born in France, Djoco is of Senegalese descent.

References

External links
 
 Clermont Foot Profile
 

1998 births
Living people
People from Juvisy-sur-Orge
French sportspeople of Senegalese descent
French footballers
Association football goalkeepers
Ligue 1 players
Ligue 2 players
Championnat National 3 players
Clermont Foot players